Jackson Mutero Chirenje (July 10, 1935 - September 23, 1988) was a Zimbabwean historian.  He was born in Mudzimuirema, Chihota, Rhodesia.  He served as Secretary of the African Teachers' Union of Rhodesia in 1961.  He received a B.A. in history from Boston University, an M.A. in history from the University of California at Los Angeles and a PhD. in history from University of London.  He taught African history, African philosophy and Afro-American history at Harvard University.  He was a senior lecturer and chairman of the history department at the University of Zimbabwe.

Bibliography
A History of Northern Botswana 1850-1910, Fairleigh-Dickinson University Press, 1977, 
A History of Zimbabwe for primary schools, Longman Zimbabwe, July 26, 1982
Chief Kgama and His Times, 1835-1923: The Story of a Southern African Ruler, Rex Collings, 1978, 
 Church, State, and Education in Bechuanaland in the Nineteenth Century, The International Journal of African Historical Studies, Vol. 9, No. 3 (1976), pp. 401–418
Chief Sekgoma Letsholathebe II: Rebel or 20th Century Tswana Nationalist?, Botswana Notes and Records, Vol. 3 (1971), pp. 64–69
Ethiopianism and Afro-Americans in Southern Africa, 1883-1916, Louisiana State University Press, 
Military and Political Aspects of Map-making in Ngamiland: A Rejoinder to Anthony Sillery's Comment, Botswana Notes and Records, Vol. 9 (1977), pp. 157–159
Portuguese Priests and Soldiers in Zimbabwe, 1560-1572: The Interplay between Evangelism and Trade, The International Journal of African Historical Studies, Vol. 6, No. 1 (1973), pp. 36–48
Zimbabwe: The Ordeal of a Frontline State in Southern Africa, University of Zimbabwe, 1987

References 

1935 births
1988 deaths
20th-century historians
Alumni of University College London
Boston University College of Arts and Sciences alumni
Harvard University faculty
Historians of Zimbabwe
University of California, Los Angeles alumni
Academic staff of the University of Zimbabwe
Zimbabwean historians